Zrinjski Mostar is a sports association from the city of Mostar, Bosnia and Herzegovina. It was formed in 1905.

Member clubs 
Football: 
HŠK Zrinjski Mostar  
Basketball: 
HKK Zrinjski Mostar (men's)
ŽKK Zrinjski Mostar (women's)
Handball:
HMRK Zrinjski Mostar (men's)
HŽRK Zrinjski Mostar (women's)
Futsal: 
HFC Zrinjski Mostar
Boxing: 
HBK Zrinjski Mostar
Athletics: 
HAK Zrinjski Mostar
Swimming: 
APK Zrinjski Mostar

External links
  

Sports teams in Bosnia and Herzegovina
Sport in Mostar
Multi-sport clubs in Bosnia and Herzegovina